Lily Pagratis Venson (October 24, 1924 – June 27, 2011) is an American journalist and was a resident of Chicago her entire life.

She attended Wilbur Wright College and Columbia College Chicago.  She began writing for Lerner Newspapers at the Rogers Park office in 1962 and was an award-winning journalist and feature writer for the Lerner newspapers.  She left the paper in 1973 to work as head of public relations for Cook County Hospitals. During her years at Lerner, she received numerous press awards including a nomination for the Pulitzer Prize by Columbia University and the City of New York, for a series of more than 100 articles she wrote on the crusade to preserve 100 acres of private golf land to create Lawrence C. Warren State Park in West Rogers Park in Chicago. For her coverage of this landmark event she was awarded a plaque of recognition in 1972 by Gov. of Illinois Richard Ogilvie.

Among her other stories of note, she covered the immigration battle in Chicago of Walter Polovchak. She also covered in person the last march of Martin Luther King Jr. from Selma to Montgomery, Alabama on March 21, 1965. She was a member of Illinois Women's Press Association.

The majority of her journalism articles and photos which covered many historical events in Chicago are housed at the Newberry Library in Chicago for archival deposit.

Family
She was married to George Venson (1910–1998) and has two grown children, Virginia and Petros.

References

External links 
 Lily Pagratis Venson Papers at the Newberry

1924 births
2011 deaths
20th-century American journalists
American women journalists
Columbia College Chicago alumni
Wilbur Wright College alumni